Meryamun (full name Ramses Meryamun) was a son of Ramses III, an Egyptian pharaoh of the 20th dynasty. He is depicted in the Medinet Habu temple with his brothers and half-brothers; nothing else is known about him.

Sources
 Dodson, Aidan, Hilton, Dyan. The Complete Royal Families of Ancient Egypt. Thames & Hudson (2004). , p. 193

11th-century BC Egyptian people
People of the Twentieth Dynasty of Egypt
Ancient Egyptian princes